Titankayuq (Quechua titanka Puya raimondii, -yuq a suffix to indicate ownership, "the one with titanka", other spellings Titancayoc, Titancayocc, Titankayoc, Titankayocc, Tutanccayoc) is one of the most important habitats in Peru for the Puya raimondii.

Titankayuq was declared an Area of Regional Conservation by Supreme Decrete of December 23, 2010.

See also 
 Inti Watana
 Pumaqucha

References 

Geography of Ayacucho Region
Nature conservation in Peru